The Canon ELPH was a full-featured compact Advanced Photo System point and shoot camera released in May 1996 as part of a series.

Features
The first camera in the ELPH series was sold in Japan as the IXY and in Europe as the IXUS. The minimalist body was designed by Canon's Yasushi Shiotani, in such a way that it would not look out of place inside a lady's handbag, and also look attractive when worn around the neck. The ELPH was, at the time, the world's smallest autofocus zoom camera, a fact which, along with its stylish stainless steel exterior, contributed greatly to its popularity. There were a number of models in the ELPH series.

Lenses
It utilized a hybrid active/passive autofocus system that used both an infrared rangefinder and a CCD sensor to ensure accurate focusing. The lens was a 24-48mm f/4.5-6.2 unit.

External links
Camera Museum - Film Cameras - ELPH 

Canon ELPH cameras
Autofocus cameras
Point-and-shoot cameras
APS film cameras